The Orlando SeaWolves was an American professional indoor soccer franchise based in the Greater Orlando area. Founded in June 2018, the team made its debut in the Major Arena Soccer League with the 2018–19 season. The team's name and logo were revealed at a press conference on April 28, 2018.  On March 13, 2020, head coach and GM Tom Traxler announced on the team's YouTube channel that the team and MASL season was abruptly over due to the COVID-19 pandemic.  The team folded shortly afterward.

Year-by-Year

Personnel

2019–20

Active players

Inactive players

Staff
  Tom Traxler - Head coach
  Maycon Franca – Assistant coach
  Christine Bickle – Equipment Manager
  Lloyd Knudson  – Trainer

Notable former players
  Gordy Gurson

References

 
2018 establishments in Florida
Major Arena Soccer League teams
Soccer clubs in Orlando, Florida
Soccer clubs in Florida
Association football clubs established in 2018
Sports in Kissimmee, Florida